Copperstain Ridge is a ridge about  long which descends north-northeast from Mount Freed, in the Bowers Mountains, a major mountain range situated within Victoria Land, Antarctica. The feature was so named by the New Zealand Geological Survey Antarctic Expedition, 1967–68, because of the extensive, ductile metal, copper staining protruding outward from the edges of the ridge. The ridge lies on the Pennell Coast, a portion of Antarctica lying between Cape Williams and Cape Adare.

References 

Ridges of Victoria Land
Pennell Coast